Homoeosoma punctistrigella is a species of snout moth in the genus Homoeosoma. It was described by Ragonot in 1888. It is found in India, Israel and Russia.

The wingspan is about 28 mm.

References

Moths described in 1888
Phycitini